State Route 83 (SR 83) is a  state highway in Conecuh and Monroe counties in the southern part of the U.S. state of Alabama. The southern terminus of the highway is at an intersection with US 31/US 84 in Evergreen. The northern terminus of the highway is at an intersection with SR 47 at the unincorporated community of Midway in Monroe County.

Route description

SR 83 heads northward from Evergreen along a two-lane road. Just north of the town, the highway has an interchange with Interstate 65 (I-65), offering motorists in the area direct access to Mobile to the southwest and Montgomery and Birmingham to the north. North of the interchange with I-65, SR 83 travels through rural areas, serving only the unincorporated communities of Lyeffion and Midway before reaching its northern terminus in eastern Monroe County.

Major intersections

See also

References

083
Transportation in Conecuh County, Alabama
Transportation in Monroe County, Alabama